MS Seatruck Precision is a ro-ro freight ferry that entered service with Seatruck Ferries in July 2012.

The vessel was on charter to Stena Line for 6 years from Seatruck Ferries, during which she was named Stena Precision.

History
She is one of four ships being constructed by Flensburger Schiffbau-Gesellschaft, Germany. Seatruck Precision is the final newbuild to be completed.

The vessel was launched in March 2012. The vessel was christened by Lynn McBurney, the wife of McBurney Transport's Norman McBurney.

The vessel entered service on the Liverpool-Dublin route on 10 July 2012.

In September 2012 Seatruck Precision along with sister ship Seatruck Performance was due to go on charter to Stena Line and be renamed Stena Precision.

Description
Seatruck Precision is one of four RoRo 2200 freight ferries, which are the largest ships in the Seatruck fleet. They are the largest ships to operate out of the port of Heysham.

The RoRo 2200 vessels have a freight capacity of 2,166 lane metres over four decks, carrying 151 trailers. Propulsion is provided by two MAN engines and twin screws.

Sister Vessels
Seatruck Performance
Seatruck Power
Seatruck Progress

References

2012 ships
Ships of Seatruck Ferries
Ferries of the United Kingdom
Ships built in Flensburg
Merchant ships of the Isle of Man